Vitthalwadi  is a panchayat village in the state of Maharashtra, India, on the left (north) bank of the Bhima River.  Administratively, Vitthalwadi is under Shirur Taluka of Pune District in Maharashtra. There is only the single village of Vitthalwadi in the Vitthalwadi gram panchayat.  The village of Vitthalwadi is 6 km by road south of the village of Talegaon Dhamdhere, and 18 km by road east of the town of Koregaon Bhima.

Demographics 
In the 2001 census, the village of Vitthalwadi had 2,948 inhabitants, with 1,527 males (51.8%) and 1,421 females (48.2%), for a gender ratio of 931 females per thousand males.

Notes

External links 
 
 

Villages in Pune district